Zhai Zhenhua (born 1951) is a Chinese autobiographical writer known for her memoir Red Flower of China, which detailed her teenage participation in Mao's Cultural Revolution.

Life
Zhai Zhenhua joined the Red Guard and as a fifteen-year-old participated in the violence of the Cultural Revolution. She was later herself purged, but rehabilitated after working on the land and in a factory.

She eventually emigrated to Canada, where she wrote her autobiography.

Works
 Red Flower of China, New York: Soho, 1993.

References

1951 births
Living people
Chinese autobiographers
Chinese women writers
Women autobiographers
Chinese emigrants to Canada
Red Guards